Serena Williams was the defending champion, but was forced to withdraw due to a left knee tendonitis.

Ai Sugiyama won the title by defeating Kim Clijsters 3–6, 7–5, 6–4 in the final.

Seeds
The first four seeds received a bye into the second round.

Draw

Finals

Top half

Bottom half

References
 Official results archive (ITF)
 Official results archive (WTA)

2003
2003 WTA Tour